Dowling Catholic High School is a Catholic secondary school in the central United States, in West Des Moines, Iowa, within the Diocese of Des Moines.

As of the 2013-14 school year, the school had an enrollment of 1,431 students and 94.6 classroom teachers (on an FTE basis), for a student–teacher ratio of 15.1:1. The school's enrollment was 81.2% White, 4.1% Black, 10.2% Hispanic, 4.4% Asian and 0.1% American Indian / Alaska Native.

History
It was created in 1972 by the merger of St. Joseph Academy for girls (established in 1884) and Dowling High School for boys (established in 1918 as the Des Moines College boarding school for boys).

Academics
During the 2003-04 school year, Dowling Catholic High School was recognized with the Blue Ribbon School Award of Excellence by the United States Department of Education, the highest award an American school can receive.

Tuition
Total tuition cost for 2018-2019 is $11,176 plus fees. Tuition for students belonging to a Catholic Parish is $7,986 plus fees.  Tuition for international students is $12,076 plus fees.

Extracurricular activities

Baseball
The Maroons hold the record for most team home runs during a championship game with 5 in 2001.

Boys' basketball

Bobby Hansen who later played at the University of Iowa and nine years in the NBA, was on the 1979 state championship team.

Cross country

Girls

2007 Girls' Heartland Regional Champions

Boys

Debate
Dowling is the home of the Dowling Catholic Paradigm, one of the largest debate tournaments held by a school. In 2015, Dowling Catholic won 2 state titles for Congressional Debate, 1 for Public Forum debate, and 1 for Lincoln Douglas Debate.

Football
Home games are played at the 9,500 seat Valley Stadium in West Des Moines, Williams Stadium, or at Drake Stadium in Des Moines. In 2019, they became the first school in Iowa history to win seven straight championships.

Dowling made the playoffs 17 years in a row beginning in 1985 and ending in 2002 when Dowling missed the playoffs. The school won 36 consecutive games in the 1967 through 1971 graduating class seasons. Dowling won 64 consecutive Metro conference games, a streak lasting from 1968 to 1977. In addition to the 64 metro games Dowling also won 57 consecutive conference games lasting from 1993 to 2002. WDM, Valley is Dowling's primary rival since 1968 when the schools joined the Des Moines Metro Conference.

Marching band 
At the Eden Prairie: Prairie Colors tournament on October 11, 2008 in Eden Prairie, Minnesota, Dowling received a first place overall, best drumline, and best winds in the class 2-A competition.

Swimming
The boys' swimming team won four championships, consecutively from 2001 to 2003. The girls' swim team won their first state title during the 2019 season.

Boys' Tennis

Wrestling

Dowling has won State Dual Wrestling Championships in 1987, 1988, 1989, 1990, 1991, and 1992 
Dowling has won the State Traditional Wrestling Championship in 1975, 1978, 1984, 1988, 1990, and 1991

Dowling has the state record for most consecutive dual wins with 136 set from January 1986 to January 1992

Notable alumni
 Michael Annett, professional NASCAR driver
 Caitlin Clark (class of 2020),  college basketball player for the University of Iowa
 Amara Darboh, wide receiver for the Seattle Seahawks.
 Jerry Groom, College Football Hall of Fame offensive lineman
Karissa Schweitzer, professional distance runner
Matt Haack, NFL punter 
Bobby Hansen, NBA basketball player.
 Tom Harkin, United States Senator (Iowa)
 Bob Harlan, former president of the Green Bay Packers
 George Kinley, businessman and Iowa state legislator
 Matt Macri, MLB third baseman 
 Mike Mahoney, MLB catcher
 Karen Maine, director and screenwriter of Yes, God, Yes
 Matt McCoy, Iowa State Senator
 Scott Pose, Major League Baseball player
 Tyson Smith, NFL linebacker
 Fred L. Turner, CEO of McDonald's
Ross Verba, NFL lineman
Shawn Crahan, Slipknot percussion

References

External links

Iowa High School Athletic Association

1884 establishments in Iowa
Roman Catholic Diocese of Des Moines
Catholic secondary schools in Iowa
Private high schools in Iowa
West Des Moines, Iowa
Schools in Polk County, Iowa
Iowa High School Athletic Association